All You Need Is Love is the third album by Die Apokalyptischen Reiter and is the first to feature the 19-year-old drummer Georg Lenhardt "Sir G." and is also the first one to feature lyrics in German. This is the band's last album to contain songs with their original style, which consists of death/thrash metal blended with melodic compositions.

Track listing
  "Licked by the Tongues of Pride"  – 3:35  
  "Unter der Asche" [Under the Ashes]  – 3:43  
  "Erhelle meine Seele" [Enlighten My Soul]  – 4:00  
  "Gone"  – 4:55  
  "Regret"  – 3:39  
  "Reitermania" [Ridermania]  – 2:57  
  "Hate"  – 2:26  
  "Peace of Mind"  – 2:55  
  "Geopfert" [Sacrificed]  – 3:29  
  "Rausch" [Inebriation]   – 3:42  
  "Die Schönheit der Sklaverei" [The Beauty of Slavery]  – 5:19  
  "...Vom Ende der Welt" [...Of the End of the World]  – 10:19

Die Apokalyptischen Reiter albums
2000 albums
Albums produced by Andy Classen